Heath VanNatter is a Republican member of the Indiana House of Representatives representing the 38th district where he has served since 2010. He previously served in the State House in 2008.

References

External links
Heath VanNatter at Ballotpedia
Project Vote Smart – Representative Heath VanNatter (IN) profile
Our Campaigns – Representative Heath VanNatter (IN) profile
Office website

|-

Living people
Republican Party members of the Indiana House of Representatives
21st-century American politicians
Year of birth missing (living people)